"Kiss the Girl" is a song written by lyricist Howard Ashman and composer Alan Menken Walt Disney Pictures' 28th animated feature film The Little Mermaid (1989). Originally recorded by American actor Samuel Wright in his film role as Sebastian, "Kiss the Girl" is a romantic calypso love song; the song's lyrics encourages Prince Eric to kiss Ariel before it's too late.

"Kiss the Girl" had a mostly positive reception. The song was nominated for both an Academy and Golden Globe Award for Best Original Song, but lost both to "Under the Sea", another song from The Little Mermaid soundtrack.

Background and composition 

This song is written in the key of C Major. The song takes place during Ariel's second day as human. Ariel and Eric are in a boat and Sebastian tries to set a romantic mood in order to inspire Eric to kiss Ariel.

Lyrics

The lyrics of the song are written in 6 stanzas of 7 verses each, each stanza closing with the refrain sung as a slight variation of expressing the expectation of what happens when "You kiss the girl". The variations of the single verse refrain start with "You wanna kiss the girl", going through slight variations in each stanza until the closing stanza which sings the refrain as "You gotta kiss the girl". The song closes with an outro which repeats each version of the refrain one after the other. The song's lyrics express the expectations of a boyfriend about to bestow a first kiss to his romantic interest.

Stage and live versions
On a two-part 1995 episode of Family Matters, "We're Going to Disney World", the song was played in the background on some love scenes between Stefan Urquelle (Played by Jaleel White) and Laura Winslow (Played by Kellie Shanygne Williams) throughout Disney World.

Certifications

Cover versions

Simply Mad About The Mouse
In 1991, Soul II Soul released a version for the compilation Simply Mad About the Mouse: A Musical Celebration of Imagination.

Little Texas
Country music band Little Texas recorded a version on the 1996 album The Best of Country Sing the Best of Disney. This rendition peaked at number 52 on the Hot Country Songs charts.

Stellar Kart
Christian Punk band Stellar Kart covered "Kiss the Girl" on their 2012 complimentary A Whole New World EP.

Peter André

When The Little Mermaid was re-released in cinemas, Peter André recorded a version of the song, which reached #9 on the UK Singles Chart.

Music video
The video shows Andre performing the song in a recording studio. Scenes from the film are intercut with the video or shown on a backdrop behind Andre and the backing singers. There are slight references to water and the undersea world in the video. As Andre performs a beautiful girl comes in carrying water. Andre sees her and is immediately taken with her. He helps her clean up the water as she spills it and follows her into the next room where they gaze at each other through a fishtank. Andre tries to kiss the girl but she backs away. He follows her again as she goes outside and they kiss.

Track listing
 CD1 
 "Kiss The Girl" - 2:52
 "Mysterious Girl (1998)" (feat. Shaggy) - 4:14
 "Just For You" - 5:02

 CD2 
 "Kiss The Girl" - 2:52
 "Kiss The Girl" (Original Disney Version) - 2:49
 "Best Of Me" - 4:03

 Cassette / 7" vinyl
 "Kiss The Girl" - 2:52
 "Mysterious Girl (1998)" (feat. Shaggy) - 4:14

Ashley Tisdale

In 2006, when The Little Mermaid was re-released on DVD as a 2-Disc Platinum Edition, another rendition of the song was recorded by Ashley Tisdale. It was included on the re-release of the film's soundtrack on October 3, 2006. It was later included on DisneyMania 5.

Music video
The music video, released on September 6, 2006, consists of a girl at a school dance. As she hangs out with her friends, she notices a boy repeatedly glancing at her. The boy's friend encourages him to talk to Tisdale, but every time he gets close, she goes somewhere else. The video ends with Tisdale asking him to dance, and then at the end she kisses him on the cheek. Tooth Tunes included the song in one of their products. The music video is included as a bonus feature on the 2006 Platinum Edition release of the film.

Charts
In the first week of April 2007, Tisdale's version of "Kiss the Girl" debuted on the Billboard's Bubbling Under Hot 100 Singles at #16. One week later, the song debuted on the Billboard Hot 100 at #81.

Brian Wilson
Brian Wilson included a cover on his 2011 album In the Key of Disney.

DisneyMania
No Secrets's version of this song was featured on the original DisneyMania, released on September 17, 2002.
Vitamin C's version was featured on DisneyMania 3, released February 15, 2005.
Ashley Tisdale's version was included on DisneyMania 5, released on March 27, 2007.
Colbie Caillat covered this song for DisneyMania 6.

Suburban Legends
Suburban Legends covered the song on their Disney covers EP, Dreams Aren't Real, But These Songs Are, Vol. 1, in 2013. The band regularly performs the song on tour and at Disneyland's Tomorrowland Terrace.

Disney - Koe no oujisama
The 2012 album Disney - Koe no Oujisama Vol.2, which features various Japanese voice actors covering Disney songs, contains a version of this song covered by Hiro Shimono.

Descendants 2

The main cast of Descendants 2 covered the song in the film's soundtrack. The song also is featured during the film's credits.

BYU Vocal Point
The members of Vocal Point including the three vocalists; Zack Dalley, Carson Trautman, & Nathan Moser, covered the song for the 2022 album Magic: Disney Through Time.

References

External links
  (on Disney's official channel)

Songs about kissing
1980s ballads
Disney Renaissance songs
1989 songs
1998 singles
2006 singles
Songs from The Little Mermaid (franchise)
Little Texas (band) songs
Aerosmith songs
Ashley Tisdale songs
Calypso songs
No Secrets (musical group) songs
Peter Andre songs
Songs with music by Alan Menken
Songs with lyrics by Howard Ashman
Songs written for films
Walt Disney Records singles
Mushroom Records singles
Warner Records singles
Song recordings produced by Alan Menken
Song recordings produced by Howard Ashman